"Buckaroo" is a song recorded by American country music artist Lee Ann Womack. It was released in April 1998 as the fourth single from her 1997 album Lee Ann Womack. The song reached No. 27 on the Billboard Hot Country Singles & Tracks chart.  The song was written by Ed Hill and Mark D. Sanders.

Chart performance

References

1998 singles
1997 songs
Lee Ann Womack songs
Songs written by Ed Hill
Songs written by Mark D. Sanders
Song recordings produced by Mark Wright (record producer)
Decca Records singles